Elemér Gyulai (19041945) was a Hungarian composer. His "Lullaby", sung by mezzo-soprano Bernadette Wiedemann and accompanied by pianist Márta Gulyás, is featured on the 2008 album In Memoriam: Hungarian Composers, Victims Of The Holocaust.

He died on the Russian Front in 1945.

References

1904 births
1945 deaths
20th-century composers
Hungarian military personnel killed in World War II